Peter Laurence O'Loghlen (1882 – 13 November 1923 ) was an Australian politician. He was the Labor member for Forrest in the Western Australian Legislative Assembly from 1908 to 1923.

References

1882 births
1923 deaths
Members of the Western Australian Legislative Assembly
Australian Labor Party members of the Parliament of Western Australia